This is Jinsy is a British comedy series. The pilot was first broadcast on 1 March 2010 on BBC Three. The programme is about the bizarre residents of the fictional island of Jinsy which is based on Guernsey, where the two writers are from. The show was written by Chris Bran and Justin Chubb who also play the leading roles. Although the pilot episode was made for the BBC, the full series of eight episodes was picked up by Sky Atlantic. The first series began airing with a double bill on 19 September 2011 and ended on 31 October 2011. A second series was commissioned and was first broadcast on 8 January 2014.

Cast
 Justin Chubb as Arbiter Maven, various
 Chris Bran as Sporall Lertock, various
 Alice Lowe as Soosan Noop
 Janine Duvitski as Mrs Goadion
 Geoff McGivern as Trince
 David Tennant as Mr Slightlyman
 Harry Hill as Joon Boolay (Series 1)
 Greg Davies as Jennitta Bishard (Series 2)
 Jennifer Saunders as The Voice of Miss Reason
 Tim Downie as Jinsy Player
 Dave Mounfield as Jinsy Player
 Emma Kennedy as Jinsy Player

Episodes

Series 1

Series 2

Production
The pilot of This is Jinsy was produced by the Welded Tandem Picture Company and filmed at Greenford Studios in July 2009. It was directed by Chris Bran and Justin Chubb; the script editor was Emma Kennedy.

Production for the first series started at the end of January 2011 and was directed by Matt Lipsey. Charlie Phillips, who worked with Lipsey on Psychoville, is the editor.

Reception
The Radio Times described the pilot as "infectiously funny as an overstuffed owl. A full series please." Time Out described it as "a lo-fi joy to behold".

Alice-Azania Jarvis, reviewing the first two episodes for The Independent, calls it "brilliantly done" and "genuinely surreal". 
Keith Watson writes in The Metro, Bran and Chubb "teetered on the brink of drowning in the ocean of whimsy", but that "This is Jinsy pulled off the trick of turning its multifarious influences into something that felt fresh and new."

Awards
The pilot episode (directed by Bran & Chubb) was nominated in the Sitcom category for the Rose d'Or 2010.

Series 1 of This is Jinsy (directed by Matt Lipsey) was nominated in the Best Sketch Show category for the British Comedy Awards 2011.

References

External links

2010 British television series debuts
2014 British television series endings
2010s British comedy television series
BBC television sitcoms
British surreal comedy television series
British musical television series
Sky Atlantic original programming
Television series set on fictional islands
English-language television shows